10 Days That Unexpectedly Changed America is a ten-hour, ten-part television miniseries that aired on the History Channel from April 9 through April 14, 2006.  The material was later adapted and published as a book by the same title.

Overview
The ten days featured in the series, in chronological order. It is important to note that the book and television series take a different approach to analyzing these events.

Sources

History (American TV channel) original programming
Television series about the history of the United States
2006 American television series debuts
2006 American television series endings
2000s American documentary television series